Svetly Log is a rural locality (a khutor) in Pyatiizbyanskoye Rural Settlement, Kalachyovsky District, Volgograd Oblast, Russia. The population was 343 as of 2010. There are 6 streets.

Geography 
Svetly Log is located 22 km west of Kalach-na-Donu (the district's administrative centre) by road. Kalach-na-Donu is the nearest rural locality.

References 

Rural localities in Kalachyovsky District